Thomas or Tom Nolan may refer to:

Politicians
Tom Nolan (Irish politician) (1921–1992), Irish Fianna Fáil politician
Thomas M. Nolan (1916–1989), Pennsylvania politician
Thomas S. Nolan (1856–1944), American  politician

Sports
Tom Nolan (Australian rules footballer) (1876–1930), Australian footballer
Tom Nolan (footballer, born 1909) (1909–1969), English footballer
Tom Nolan (hurler) (died 2007), Irish hurler

Others
Thomas Brennan Nolan (1901–1992), American geologist
Tom Nolan (actor) (born 1948), Canadian-American actor